Chandma Kalan is a patwar circle and village in ILRC Madhorajpura in Phagi tehsil in Jaipur district, Rajasthan. Chandma Kalan is also a patwar circle for nearby villages, Ajnota, Unt Ka Khera, Chandarpura and Bisaloo.

In Chandma Kalan, there are 327 households with total population of 2,287 (with 50.59% males and 49.41% females), based on 2011 census.

Total area of village is 11.98 sq km. There are 2 primary schools and one post office in the village.

References

Villages in Jaipur district